River City Bangkok, The Anchor of Arts & Antiques (RCB) is the premier hub of art, antiques and cultured lifestyles center in Bangkok, Thailand. It is on the Chao Phraya River on the Si Phraya Pier near many large hotels. It is accessible by car or boat.

History 
River City Bangkok, The Anchor of Arts & Antiques was Designed by Krisda Arunvongse na Ayudhya and developed by the Italthai Group and The Mandarin Oriental Hotel Group, it opened on 1 December 1984 with total floor area of 47,567 m².

Composition 
Tenants of River City Bangkok are 60 percent art and antique shops, 20 percent lifestyle shops specialized in leather work, silks, tailored suits, furniture and home décor, and 20 percent restaurants and cafes, totalling to 160 shops. The four floors are arranged by categories of goods and services. The RCB Artery Zone is designed to host events. RCB Galleria on the second floor is well-suited to gallery-style art exhibitions.

River City Auction (RCB Auctions) 
Established in July 1985, Riverside Auction House is an arts and antiques auction house. Every first Saturday of the month for the past 30 years, it has held 400 auctions consisting of 80,000 transactions and over 700 million baht in total sales.

See also 
 List of shopping malls in Thailand
 List of largest shopping malls in Thailand

References

External links
River City Bangkok, The Anchor of Arts & Antiques

Shopping malls in Bangkok
Shopping malls established in 1984
Mandarin Oriental Hotel Group
1984 establishments in Thailand
Buildings and structures on the Chao Phraya River